Tenant may refer to:

Real estate

Tenant, the holder of a leasehold estate in real estate
Tenant-in-chief, in feudal land law
Tenement (law), the holder of a legal interest in real estate
Tenant farmer
Anchor tenant, one of the larger stores in a shopping mall

Film and literature

The Tenant, 1976 Roman Polanski film
The Tenant (1957 film), a 1957 Spanish drama film
The Tenant (novel), a novel by Roland Topor
The Tenants (2005 film), 2005 film drama starring Dylan McDermott and Snoop Dogg

Computing systems

Tenant, a group of users who share a common access to a multitenancy software system
Tenant, a unit of Microsoft Office 365 software subscription service

Other uses

The Tenants (band), from Bathurst, New South Wales, Australia

See also
Tenet (disambiguation)
Tennant (disambiguation)
Tennent, a surname